The second Mujib cabinet  was the first government of sovereign and independent Bangladesh. After independence, on 12 January 1972, Sheikh Mujibur Rahman assumed office as the second Prime Minister of Bangladesh and left office on 16 March 1973.

Predecessor:- Provisional Government of Bangladesh

Successor:- People's Republic of Bangladesh

Cabinet
The cabinet was composed of the following ministers:

Notes

References

Sheikh Mujibur Rahman ministries
Cabinets established in 1972
Cabinets disestablished in 1975
Bangladesh Awami League